Jonathan Sebastián Charquero López (born 21 February 1989, in Montevideo) is a Uruguayan footballer currently plays for Deportivo Coatepeque.

Career

Club career
On 17 September 2021, Charquero joined Guatemalan club Deportivo Coatepeque.

International career
Charquero has played for the Uruguay under-20 team at the 2009 FIFA U-20 World Cup in Egypt. Previously, he played the 2009 South American Youth Championship in Venezuela where he scored a goal against Colombia.

References

External links
 Profile at Soccerway
 Profile at Footballdatabase

1989 births
Living people
Uruguayan footballers
Uruguayan expatriate footballers
Uruguay under-20 international footballers
Association football forwards
Montevideo Wanderers F.C. players
Club Nacional de Football players
Juventud de Las Piedras players
Club Alianza Lima footballers
C.A. Cerro players
Boston River players
Montevideo City Torque players
Santiago Wanderers footballers
Cerro Largo F.C. players
Villa Teresa players
Cobán Imperial players
Deportivo Coatepeque players
Rampla Juniors players
Chilean Primera División players
Uruguayan Primera División players
Peruvian Primera División players
Uruguayan Segunda División players
Liga Nacional de Fútbol de Guatemala players
Uruguayan expatriate sportspeople in Chile
Uruguayan expatriate sportspeople in Peru
Uruguayan expatriate sportspeople in Guatemala
Expatriate footballers in Chile
Expatriate footballers in Peru
Expatriate footballers in Guatemala